The Democratic People's Republic of Korea (North Korea) competed in the 2017 Asian Winter Games in Sapporo and Obihiro, Japan from February 19 to 26. The country is competed in one sport (skating) and two disciplines: figure skating and short track speed skating. The North Korean team will consist of seven athletes.

North Korea finished the games with one medal, a bronze in the pairs figure skating competition. This was exactly the same result the country achieved at the last games in 2011.

Background
North Korea is scheduled to return to competition after missing the last edition of the games in 2011. The country had to request special permission from Japanese authorities so its athletes and officials could enter the country. Current Japanese law bans citizens of the country from entering Japan. On February 6, 2017, the Japanese government announced its decision to allow the North Korean delegation of 20 people to enter the country.

Medal summary

Medal table

Medalists

Competitors
The following table lists the North Korean delegation per sport and gender.

Figure skating

North Korea has entered a two athletes into the pairs competition.

Short track speed skating

North Korea has entered a full men's team of five athletes.

Men
Kim Chol-gwang
Kim Pyol-song
Kim Tae-song
Choe Un-song
Pak Gwang-myong

References

Nations at the 2017 Asian Winter Games
Asian Winter Games
North Korea at the Asian Winter Games